Guau! is a talkshow for the Mexican gay community transmitted by Telehit, hosted by Alex Kaffie and Alejandra Bogue.

References
Telehit News official website

TeleHit original programming
Mexican LGBT-related television shows
Mexican television talk shows